Talocalcaneal ligament may refer to:
 Anterior talocalcaneal ligament (ligamentum talocalcaneum anterius)
 Interosseous talocalcaneal ligament (ligamentum talocalcaneum interosseum)
 Lateral talocalcaneal ligament (ligamentum talocalcaneum laterale)
 Medial talocalcaneal ligament (ligamentum talocalcaneum mediale)
 Posterior talocalcaneal ligament (ligamentum talocalcaneum posterius)